Unfair practices may refer to

 Unfair business practices
 Unfair competition
 Unfair labor practice

See also 
 Unfair dismissal
 Social injustice